Alva is an unincorporated community and census-designated place (CDP) in Lee County, Florida, United States, situated on the Caloosahatchee River. The population was 2,725 at the 2020 census, up from 2,596 at the 2010 census. It is part of the Cape Coral-Fort Myers, Florida Metropolitan Statistical Area.

Geography
It is bordered to the west by Olga, to the south by Lehigh Acres, and to the east by the community of Fort Denaud in Hendry County. Florida State Road 80 passes through Alva, leading east  to LaBelle and west  to the center of Fort Myers.

The Caloosahatchee River flows from east to west through the center of the community.

Demographics

As of the census of 2000, there were 2,182 people, 912 households, and 673 families residing in the CDP. The racial makeup of the CDP was 96.33% White, 0.18% African American, 0.32% Native American, 0.18% Asian, 0.14% Pacific Islander, 1.24% from other races, and 1.60% from two or more races. Hispanic or Latino of any race were 2.89% of the population. According to the 2010 census, the population had risen to 2,596, 96.47% of whom were white, 0.35% African American, 0.50% Asian, 0.31% Native American, 0.58% mixed race, 0.81% other single race.

There were 912 households, out of which 22.7% had children under the age of 18 living with them, 64.9% were married couples living together, 5.9% had a female householder with no husband present, and 26.2% were non-families. 21.5% of all households were made up of individuals, and 12.4% had someone living alone who was 65 years of age or older.  The average household size was 2.39 and the average family size was 2.73.

In the CDP, the population was spread out, with 18.9% under the age of 18, 4.1% from 18 to 24, 22.1% from 25 to 44, 31.7% from 45 to 64, and 23.2% who were 65 years of age or older.  The median age was 48 years. For every 100 females, there were 96.9 males.  For every 100 females age 18 and over, there were 96.1 males.

The median income for a household in the CDP was $41,938, and the median income for a family was $48,073. Males had a median income of $35,300 versus $25,656 for females. The per capita income for the CDP was $24,353.  About 5.9% of families and 7.8% of the population were below the poverty line, including 15.4% of those under age 18 and 2.7% of those age 65 or over.

Historic library and museum
Alva is the home of a small library dating back to 1909 and a chapel that opened in 1901. The Alva Library was the first library in what is today Lee County and was constructed in the classical revival style.

The Alva Library grew from the private Alva Book Club into the first public library in southwest Florida, thanks in part to donation of land from Captain Peter Nelson. The founder of the book club and Alva's first librarian was Esther Hovey. The library closed in 1937, but remained in use over the years for various purposes such as high school art classes and a community center. In 1974, the Alva Garden Club turned the building into a museum with the Library Association trustees' permission.

Both the library and the 1901 chapel are currently open to the public and house the town's nonprofit museum, which features Seminole artifacts and objects from the town's founding families.

Notable people
 Chad Chastain (1998–) current part-time driver in the NASCAR Camping World Truck Series for Niece Motorsports
 Ross Chastain (1992–) current NASCAR Cup Series driver for the Trackhouse Racing Team
 Mindy McCready (1975–2013), former American Country Music Artist, buried in Alva

References

External links
 Alva, Inc., rural preservation group

Census-designated places in Lee County, Florida
Census-designated places in Florida